6th Alkino (6-sı Alkin) is a rural locality (a settlement) in Dmitriyevsky Selsovet of Blagovarsky District, Russia. The population was 148 as of 2010.

Geography 
6th Alkino is located 54 km west of Yazykovo (the district's administrative centre) by road. Obshchina is the nearest rural locality.

Ethnicity 
The village is inhabited by Tatars, Russians and others.

Streets 
 Rechnaya

References

External links 
 Council of Municipalities of the Republic of Bashkortostan (official website)

Rural localities in Blagovarsky District